"Sunset Glow" (Korean: 붉은 노을; Revised Romanization: Byulkeun Noeul) is a song recorded by South Korean singer Lee Moon-sae. It was released on September 15, 1988, as a single for his fifth studio album 가로수 그늘아래서면 (Under the shade of a tree) (1988). The lyrics and music were composed by Lee Yeong-hun.

Big Bang version

"Sunset Glow" (Korean: 붉은 노을; Revised Romanization: Byulkeun Noeul) is a song recorded by South Korean boy band Big Bang. Released on November 5, 2008 through YG Entertainment, it served as the lead single from the quintet's second studio album Remember (2008).  It is a remake of Lee Moon-se's song of the same title.

Background 
Prior to recording, Yang Hyun-suk, CEO and founder of YG Entertainment, contacted Lee Moon-se to request permission for BigBang to cover the song, whose original single was released in 1988.  During the 2008 KBS Music Festival, the two artists performed the song together. The song reached number one on the KBS's music show Music Bank. It charted on Melon Top 100 Chart for 31 weeks. In 2012, "Sunset Glow" was covered by Teen Top's Niel, C.A.P. and Chunji for SBS's 1,000 Songs Challenge.

Track listing

Awards

Music program awards

References

External links 
 

1988 singles
1988 songs
BigBang (South Korean band) songs
YG Entertainment singles
Korean-language songs
Songs written by G-Dragon
2008 singles
2008 songs